The 2009 Blue Square Greyhound Derby took place during May with the final being held on 30 May 2009 at Wimbledon Stadium. The winner Kinda Ready received £100,000.

Final result 
At Wimbledon (over 480 metres):

Distances 
Neck, 3, 1½, 1¾, 1½ (lengths)
The distances between the greyhounds are in finishing order and shown in lengths. One length is equal to 0.08 of one second.

Race report
It took five rounds of action to narrow down the field to the final six greyhounds. Kinda Ready was the eventual winner, after picking up Fear Zafonic near the line. The rest of the field encountered crowding leaving the front two to battle it out. An April 2007 whelp, Kinda Ready was the youngest in the final, and was also the biggest price winner in the history of the Derby at Wimbledon. And biggest since 1975 at White City the previous home of the derby. This year also saw no Irish trained greyhounds in the final with last year's Irish Greyhound Derby winner Shelbourne Aston bowing out in the quarter-finals.

Quarter-finals

Semifinals

See also 
2009 UK & Ireland Greyhound Racing Year

References

Results
May 2009%2000:00:00&track=Wimbledon/ Results and video of the race

External links
Greyhound Board of Great Britain
Greyhound Data

Greyhound Derby
English Greyhound Derby
English Greyhound Derby